Eliyahu Lankin (25 September 1914 – 10 August 1994) was a Revisionist Zionist activist, Irgun member and an Israeli politician.

Biography
Eliyahu Lankin was born in Gomel, and moved with his family to Manchuria at the age of three in the wake of the October Revolution. He studied at the Russian High School in Harbin. At the age of 16, he joined Betar and immigrated to Mandatory Palestine three years later.

Lankin died in 1994, and was buried on Har HaMenuchot. A street in Jerusalem in the neighborhood of Arnona was named after him.

Political activism
In 1934, Lankin joined the Irgun. From 1935 to 1939, he was a member of the Notrim, responsible for defending Jewish lives and property from Arab raids. As an Irgun member, he participated in landing illegal Jewish immigrants on Palestine's Mediterranean coast. In May 1944, he was appointed Commander of the Jerusalem District. He took part in the attack on the British intelligence office in Jerusalem in July 1944. In December 1944, he was arrested by the British as a result of informing by the Haganah and was exiled to Africa. After several attempts, he succeeded - the only one of 107 prisoners - in escaping from the camp in Eritrea on November 10, 1945. Eventually, he arrived in Paris in January 1947 and was appointed commander of the Irgun headquarters in Europe. He commanded the Altalena, which he brought to Israel. After coming ashore, he was arrested by the Israeli government and was kept in administrative detention for two months, along with four other Irgun commanders.

On release, he joined the IDF, graduated from an officer's course, and was a battalion commander.

He served as a member of the first Knesset, representing Herut. Later, he studied law at the Hebrew University, and was certified as a lawyer in 1954.

Diplomatic career
After the Likud's rise to power, he was appointed ambassador to South Africa, serving from 1981 to 1985.
In 1983, Israeli Prime Minister Menachem Begin named Lankin ambassador to the United Kingdom. The British government was outraged over his selection due to his Irgun past, and warned that it would harm Anglo-Israeli relations. The crisis was resolved when Lankin declined the offer and continued to serve as ambassador to South Africa.

References

Further reading
The Story of the Captain of the Altalena (1974 autobiography)

External links

1914 births
1994 deaths
Belarusian Jews
Betar members
Irgun members
Ambassadors of Israel to South Africa
Herut politicians
People from Gomel
Chinese Jews
Chinese Zionists
Members of the 1st Knesset (1949–1951)
Israeli people of Belarusian-Jewish descent
White Russian emigrants to China
Chinese emigrants to Mandatory Palestine